5Gang: Another Kind of Christmas is a 2019 Romanian action comedy film directed by Matei Dima. It stars Andrei "Selly" Șelaru, Diana Condurache, Andrei Gavril, Luca Bogdan Adrian and Mădălin Șerban Păcurar, members of the real-life trap group 5GANG, as themselves in a fictional story about their musical band; when Selly is kidnapped after performing at the anniversary of a local crime boss' daughter birthday, the other band members have to rescue him.

The film premiered in Romania on December 27, 2019. A box office success, it became the highest-grossing film in its country in the last thirty years and gained more than $1.5 million during its theatrical run.

References

External links 
 

2019 action comedy films
2019 films
Romanian action comedy films
2010s Romanian-language films
Romanian Christmas films